Pasi Hulkkonen (born 18 January 1961) is a Finnish modern pentathlete. He competed at the 1984 Summer Olympics.

References

External links
 

1961 births
Living people
Finnish male modern pentathletes
Olympic modern pentathletes of Finland
Modern pentathletes at the 1984 Summer Olympics
People from Orimattila
Sportspeople from Päijät-Häme